Melanoma with features of a Spitz nevus (also known as a "Spitzoid melanoma") is a cutaneous condition characterized histologically with tissue similar to a spitz nevus and with overall symmetry and a dermal nodule of epithelioid melanocytes that do not mature with progressively deeper dermal extension.

See also 
 Melanoma
 Spitz nevus
 List of cutaneous conditions

References 

Melanoma